Mount Irvine is a mountain in the Sierra Nevada of California. The summit is in the Inyo National Forest and the John Muir Wilderness. The peak was named in memory of Andrew Irvine, of the 1924 British Mount Everest expedition, who perished on Mount Everest, June, 1924. Norman Clyde proposed Irvine's and George H. Leigh Mallory's names following their loss after attaining the highest altitude reached by a mountaineer.

Geography 
Mount Irvine is located southeast of Mount Whitney, and is flanked to the south by Mount Mallory. The summit is a quarter mile east of the Sierra Crest, in Inyo County.

Climbing 
There are several routes typically used to climb Mount Irvine. The southeast slope, reached from Richins Pass, presents the most obvious route, but the mountain is often climbed in conjunction with Mount Mallory by way of a  traverse.

See also 
 Mountain peaks of California

References

External links 
 

Mountains of the John Muir Wilderness
Mountains of Inyo County, California
Mountains of Northern California
Sierra Nevada (United States)